Bronkhorstspruit Dam is a concrete-arch type dam on the Bronkhorst Spruit, near Bronkhorstspruit, Gauteng, South Africa. It was established in 1950 and its main purpose is for domestic supply and industrial use.

The lake's shores are home to numerous recreational resorts and exclusive housing projects. It is a mecca for boating and water sports such as sailing, jetskiing, waterskiing and parasailing.

See also
List of reservoirs and dams in South Africa
List of rivers of South Africa

References 

 List of South African Dams from the Department of Water Affairs

External links 
Bronkhorstspruit Dam - A fishing guide

Dams in South Africa
Dams completed in 1950
Olifants River (Limpopo)